Akua Anokyewaa  (born 15 October 1984) is a Ghanaian women's international footballer who plays as a forward. She is a member of the Ghana women's national football team. She was part of the team at the 2003 FIFA Women's World Cup.

References

1984 births
Living people
Ghanaian women's footballers
Ghana women's international footballers
Place of birth missing (living people)
2003 FIFA Women's World Cup players
Women's association football forwards